Televen is a private Venezuelan national television network headquartered on the Caracas neighborhood of Horizonte. For this reason it is also called 'Canal de Horizonte'. Televen was inaugurated as the TELEVEN Corporation (Corporación TELEVEN, S.A) on July 10, 1988 by Omar Camero Zamora and T Radioven, S.A. As an alternative for the two-leading-private TV Networks on Venezuela, Radio Caracas Televisión (RCTV) and Venevision, Televen distanced itself from this trend and made a different oriented programming in some cases the middle classes who do not usually watch TV and it was open and being composed of talk shows, sports, movies, a full range of series, mainly American, and Brazilian, Colombian, Mexican, and U.S. Hispanic telenovelas, and in the 1990s, anime.

History
On February 12, 1988, the test signal of Televen began. In channel 10 in Caracas and transmitted musical videos, 

On July 3, 1988, Televen space that has been the history of the Venezuelan television,  was shown that customers and advertisers Televen also supported the project.

On March 17, at the main offices of the National Institute of Parks of Venezuela (Inparques), representatives from Omnivisión and Televen, signed an agreement which guaranteed the environmental protection of the El Cuño hill, a place where both networks had installed antennas.

In November, the press department of Televen informed the media that their signal would go on the air in Zulia and Falcón on NTSC-M channel A13. On December 20, they expanded their signal to Guarenas and Guatire.

In 1989, Televen became the first television network in Venezuela to air nudity during prime time.

On January 18, 1989, Omar Camero Zamora, President of Televen, requested a news conference to clarify that the network had not been sold, but 33% of the company's stock had been negotiated by a group of businessmen judicially managed by Pedro Tinoco.

In March 1989, the Vice-president of Production of Televen, Jorge Font, announced the acquisition of the Cedros and Macaracuay theaters by the network for the use of developing television studios in them.

With the help of investors (including Venezuelan television personality Guillermo "Fantastico" Gonzalez) in the early 1990s, Televen quickly expanded their coverage to all of Venezuela and managed to attract a larger audience share than the state-owned network, Venozolana de Televisión, but it still remained far behind RCTV and Venevision.

On February 10, 1992, in light of the suspension of constitutional guarantees as a result of the events of February 4th, Televen suspended their opinion programs.

On June 15, 1993, Televen put into service their largest antenna –a tower with the height of 150 meters, 24 transmission panels, and 30 kilowatts of power– which allowed their signal to reach all of Zulia.

In 1994, Televen started a new cycle on Venezuelan television, offering 24 uninterrupted hours of programming.

In 1996, the Camero family retook control of Televen and, thanks to the investments of their stock holders, the network expanded and began transmitting its signal digitally on Intelsat 709 satellite.

In 1997, Televen launched their webpage and later won the ANDA award in the "New Advertising Technologies" category.                      
8 transmitters are acquired to begin operations in cities where the signal was not received Televen: Maturin, Valle de la Pascua, Mérida, Valencia, Puerto Cabello. In other cities the existing transmitters are upgraded: Caracas, Coro, Central Coast, Maracaibo, Maracay, Puerto Ordaz, Puerto La Cruz and Margarita.   
                                                                                
In 1998 the channel celebrated its first decade. It began transmitting its signal with the highest technology via satellite "Intelsat 806". It acquired and began to remodel a building to install its new headquarters to a larger space, able to support its growth. That year, they began to see the fruits of a successful policy direction and programming.
                                                 
In 2004, Televen began producing more shows and restructured their prime time schedule.

Televen has been known to occasionally export some of their programs overseas.  One of these was Chamokropolis, which was similar to a show that Televen also aired, called Nubeluz, which came from Peru.

Televen, along with Venevisión, successfully got the rights to broadcasting Venezuelan national baseball games from RCTV and received the right to broadcast baseball games from U.S. Major League Baseball.

Televen once aired the popular Japanese cartoons (also known as "anime") Saint Seiya (Los Caballeros Del Zodiaco), Slam Dunk, Magic Knight Rayearth (Las Guerreras Magicas), Sailor Moon, Slayers (Los Justicieros), and Captain Tsubasa (Oliver y Benji), Ninja Hattori-kun, and (Hattori el Ninja), among other popular titles.

Televen also aired TV series from the 90s like Rescue 911 (Rescate 911), The Simpsons (Los Simpsons), The Nanny (La Ninera), Full House (Tres por Tres), Saved by the Bell (Salvados por la Campana), The Wonder Years (Los Años Maravillosos), The Fresh Prince of Bel-Air (El Principe del Rap), Home Improvement (Mejorando la Casa), Clueless, Hang Time (Estrellas Escolares), Blossom, Doogie Howser M.D., Boy Meets World (Aprendiendo a Vivir), Who's The Boss (Quien Manda a Quien), Friends, South Park, Happy Tree Friends, Drawn Together (La casa de los dibujos), Sabrina, the Teenage Witch (Sabrina, la bruja Adolescente), Buffy the Vampire Slayer and Freakazoid (Fenomenoide).

Televen also aired Club Disney, a block of Disney cartoons including Darkwing Duck (El Pato Darkwing), Ducktales (Pato Aventuras), Goof Troop (La Tropa Goofy), 101 Dalmatians (101 Dalmatas), Doug (Doug de Disney), Bonkers, and Chip 'n Dale Rescue Rangers.

Televen also aired cartoon shows including Earthworm Jim (Jim el Gusano), Freakazoid (Fenomenoide), Teenage Mutant Ninja Turtles       (Las Tortugas Ninjas), Dennis the Menace (Daniel el Travieso), Poochini, The ThunderCats (Los ThunderCats), Scooby-Doo, The Smurfs (Los Pitufos), Popeye the Sailor (Popeye El Marino), Merrie Melodies (Fantasias Animadas de Ayer y Hoy), Tom & Jerry (Tom y Jerry), Captain Planet and the Planeteers (El Capitan Planeta), Spider-Man (El Hombre Arana), Ren and Stimpy (El Show de Ren y Stimpy), Rugrats (Aventuras en Panales), Hey Arnold! (Oye! Arnold), 3 Friends and Jerry (Tres Amigos y Jerry), Speed Racer (Meteoro) Donkey Kong Country (El Pais de Donkey Kong) SpongeBob SquarePants (Bob Esponja) CatDog Rocko's Modern Life (La Vida Moderana de rocko)  and Inspector Gadget (El Inspector Gadget).

Televen also aired classic sitcoms and dramas like Batman, The Green Hornet (El Avispon Verde), Bewitched (Hechizada), I Dream of Jeannie (Mi Bella Genio), The Munsters (Los Munsters), I Love Lucy (Yo Amo a Lucy), Gilligan's Island (La Isla de Gilligan), Airwolf (Lobo del Aire), Bonanza, Combat! (Combate), Star Trek: The Next Generation (Viaje a las Estrellas), and Baywatch (Guardianes de la Bahia).

Televen also aired the Mexican kids' cartoons ¡Vivan los niños!, Amigos x Siempre, Carita de Ángel, Cuento de Navidad . El Chavo Animado, Rebelde, Atrévete a Soñar, El Diario de Daniela.

Headquarters
Thus, with an investment of 22 million dollars and the strong will of its shareholders, its human resources, customers and advertisers, Televen achieved its objectives.

In 1999, Televen showed a growth of 100%. With the latest technology, its signal covers the entire country. In 2000, significant investments were made which drove the growth of the channel, both domestically and internationally.

With technological innovations, framed at the beginning of a new century, Televen met one of the most important goals in its history. The new headquarters, planned building entirely with digital technology, becoming the country's most modern building in terms of TV systems are concerned.

Criticism
Televen was neutral in their political views until the arrival of Hugo Chávez, when it became a critic of the government.  After the 2004 recall referendum, Televen has attempted to return to its neutral status by cancelling the political opinion program hosted by journalist Marta Colomina, who is a fierce critic of the government.  Due to the decline of advertisement prices in television because of the two-month-long general strike, it has forced the network (along with some of its national and regional competitors) to lose some of their independence by accepting advertising from the Brazilian sect Universal Church of the Kingdom of God.

In 2005, Televen presented evidence to the Venezuelan courts of an alleged deal involving advertising costs between its principal competitors, RCTV and Venevisión.

Because Televen decided to become neutral, many in the Venezuelan Opposition and Anti-Chávez groups criticized Televen of submitting to Chávez. Opposition criticism increased against Televen during the closure of RCTV.  Many in the opposition criticized Televen of not supporting freedom of speech because Televen, and its rival Venevisión did not speak out against the closure of RCTV. Many view Televen secretly supported the closure since it would make it the second most watched television network , originally it was third after Venevisión (second most watched) and RCTV (the most watched channel). By 2010, Televen became the most watched TV network in Venezuela, beating Venevision and the state TV channels (VTV, TVes and ViVe). Telemundo's soap opera Más Sabe el Diablo is the most watched serial in the country.

News and broadcastsEl Noticiero Televen (The Televen Newscast) is the current newscast of Televen. It is broadcast four times a day (6:00 AM, 8:00 AM, 12:00 PM and 10:00 PM), except for Sundays, when it only comes on during important events such as elections.

Programs
 100% Venezuela Al Rojo Vivo La Bomba Campaña de valores Chataing Diálogo con Entre Periodistas José Vicente hoy Misión Emilio El Noticiero ¿Quién Quiere Ser Millonario? Regiones Responsabilidad social Se ha dicho El show de Maite Tu voz estéreo Un minuto para ganar Vitrina En ConstrucionSeries
 5 viudas sueltas El Chavo del Ocho Como dice el dicho CSI: Crime Scene Investigation CSI: Miami CSI: NY Decisiones Grachi Happy Tree Friends La hora Warner Law & Order La Magia de Sofia Mujer, Casos de la Vida Real Mujeres Asesinas La rosa de Guadalupe Rosas y espinas The Simpsons Voces del más allá''

References

External links
Official website 

 
Television channels and stations established in 1988
Conglomerate companies of Venezuela
Television networks in Venezuela
Television stations in Venezuela
1988 establishments in Venezuela
Mass media in Caracas
Venezuelan brands